Fernando Piñero Gallego (born 22 February 1967) is a Spanish racing cyclist. He rode in the 1992 Tour de France.

References

External links
 

1967 births
Living people
Spanish male cyclists
Place of birth missing (living people)
People from Águilas